Sarah Friar (born 24 December 1972) is a business executive from Northern Ireland who is CEO of American technology company Nextdoor.

Biography 
She grew up in the town of Sion Mills in Northern Ireland. She graduated  from the University of Oxford and Stanford Graduate School of Business. She was an analyst for McKinsey, and at Goldman Sachs before becoming Chief Financial Officer at Square, and then joining Nextdoor, a hyperlocal social networking service for neighborhoods, as the CEO.

She is on the board of Slack, Walmart and ConsenSys.

References 

Living people
American business executives
People from County Tyrone
Alumni of the University of Oxford
Stanford University alumni
McKinsey & Company people
Goldman Sachs people
1972 births
Businesspeople from Northern Ireland